Paolo Valcarenghi (died 1780) was an Italian physician who worked in Cremona. He was prolific in his medical writings, often based on his erudite knowledge of ancient classic medical texts in Latin and Greek.

Biography
Valcarenghi was born in Cremona. He became the primary professor of Medicine at the University of Pavia and taught at the Scuole Palatine of Milan. He was admitted as a member of numerous academic and medical societies in Italy, including the Collegi de Medici di Milano, Cremona, Ferrara and Brescia. 

Among his works are:
De aortae aneurysmate osdervationes binae cum animadvesionibus (1741) Cremona
Ad Clarissimus Virum Franciscum Comirem Roncallum Parolinum & Diatriba Epistolaris (1747) Brescia
Dell'uso e dell'abuso del Rabarbaro unito alla ChinaChina. Dissertazione epistolare, (1748) Cremona
Rifflessioni medico-practiche sopra la lettera familiare del Docto Ignazio Pedattri medico Cremonese, (1749) Cremona on the above.
Discorsi due Epistolari sopra una terra salina purgante di fresco nel Piemonte scoperta (1757) TurinEbenbitar Tractarum de mali limoniis Commentarioa (1758) regarding the writings of the healing properties of lemons by the Andalusian Muslim physician, Ibn al-Baytar (1197–1248), written along with the fellow Cremonese physician, Martino GhisiDe potenti, vel impotentia ad genereandum ob virulentam gonorrhaeara in Titii circumstanstiis considerandam, (1749) MilanDissertatio medica epistolaris de Virgine Cremonense, quae per plures annos maleficiata fuit''  (1746) Cremona. This dissertation was about a young female who was able to putatively spontaneously vomit stones, needles, iron pieces and glass, and who was deemed a witch. Valcarenghi attributed it to more natural phenomena. He was opposed by a priest and Andrea Fromond.

References 

1715 births
1794 deaths
18th-century Italian physicians
Witchcraft in Italy
People from Cremona